HD 221420 (HR 8935; Gliese 4340) is a likely binary star system in the southern circumpolar constellation Octans. It has an apparent magnitude of 5.81, allowing it to be faintly seen with the naked eye.

HD 221420 has a stellar classification of G2 IV-V, indicating a solar analogue with a luminosity class intermediate between a subgiant and a main sequence star. The object is also extremely chromospherically inactive. HD 221420 is younger than the Sun at 3.65 billion years. Despite this, the star is already beginning to evolve off the main sequence. Like most planetary hosts, HD 221420 has a metallicity over twice of that of the Sun and spins modestly with a projected rotational velocity .

There is a mid-M-dwarf star with a similar proper motion and parallax to HD 221420, which is likely gravitationally bound to it.

Planetary system

In a 2019 doppler spectroscopy survey, an exoplanet was discovered orbiting the star.

References

G-type main-sequence stars
G-type subgiants
Octans
Planetary systems with one confirmed planet
Brown dwarfs
221420
116250
8935
PD-78 01473
4340
Octantis, 83